Chrysodeixis includens, the soybean looper, is a moth of the family Noctuidae. It is known as falso medidor in north-eastern Mexico. It is found from southern Quebec and southern Ontario through the eastern and southern part of the United States to Central America and South America, the Antilles and the Galápagos Islands. It is known to be migratory. The species was first described by Francis Walker in 1858.

The wingspan is 28–39 mm. The adults are on wing from April to November depending on the location.

The larvae feed on a wide range of plants. Recorded food plants are Asteraceae, Brassicaceae, Commelinaceae, Euphorbiaceae, Fabaceae, Geraniaceae, Lamiaceae, Lauraceae, Malvaceae, Solanaceae, Verbenaceae, Medicago sativa, Phaseolus polystachios, Glycine max, Gossypium herbaceum, Nicotiana tabacum, Lycopersicum esculentum, Brassica and Lactuca sativa.

The Mexican free-tailed bat (Tadarida brasiliensis) may feed on the soybean looper.

External links

Plusiinae
Moths of North America
Moths described in 1858